Šemša (1280 Scemse, 1310 Sempse, 1318 Scemse, Zemsce, Scemche, 1328 Zemse, Zemsa, 1350 Scemcha, 1427 Scempse) is a village and municipality in Košice-okolie District in the Kosice Region of eastern Slovakia.

History
In historical records the village was first mentioned in 1280 when it belonged to Ruszkay lords of Abaúj County in the Kingdom of Hungary. In 1322 it was bought by the castle lord Thomas from Szepes County, who originated the noble family Semsey (“of Šemša”). in 1324 a sector of the village (known as Ižipova Šemša) newly belonged to Ruszkay family. After the Treaty of Trianon, the village belonged to Czechoslovakia. From 1938 to 1945 it was annexed by Hungary.

Geography
The municipality lies at an altitude of 330 metres and covers an area of 17.168 km2. It has a population of 730 people

External links

http://www.cassovia.sk/semsa/

Villages and municipalities in Košice-okolie District